The Red Bullet Tour, also known as 2014 BTS Live Trilogy Episode II: The Red Bullet and 2015 BTS Live Trilogy Episode II: The Red Bullet, was the first concert tour headlined by South Korean boy band BTS to promote their 2 Cool 4 Skool (2013) debut single album, O!RUL8,2? (2013) EP, Skool Luv Affair (2014) EP, and Dark & Wild (2014) studio album. The tour began on October 17, 2014 in South Korea and initially visited six cities in Asia. Its world tour extension began on June 6, 2015 in Malaysia and toured Australia, North America and Latin America before ending in Hong Kong that August. In all, the entire tour attracted 80,000 spectators at 18 cities in 13 countries.

Background 
Following the release of their first studio album Dark & Wild August 2014, BTS released a video teaser on YouTube and a poster on September 4, 2014 announcing their first concert tour, titled 2014 BTS Live Trilogy Episode II: The Red Bullet, with October dates for two shows at AX-Korea in South Korea. The two shows sold out within 2 minutes, prompting the addition of a third show in South Korea followed by dates in Japan, the Philippines, Singapore and Thailand.

Set list
The following set list is obtained from the show on December 7, 2014 in Manila, Philippines. It is not intended to represent all dates throughout the tour.

 N.O
 We Are Bulletproof Pt 2.
 We On
 Hiphop Lover
 Let Me Know
 Rain
 Embarrassed
 Just One Day
 Look Here
 Outro: Propose (Jin, Jimin, V, Jungkook)
 No More Dream
 Tomorrow
 Miss Right
 I Like It
 If I Ruled the World
 Cypher Pt.3 Killer (Rap Monster, SUGA, J-Hope)
 Cypher Pt.2 Triptych (encore) 
 War of Hormone
 Danger
 Boy In Luv
Encore
  Road/Path
 Jump
 Attack On Bangtan
 Paldogangsan

Tour dates

World tour extension

Background 
On May 7, 2015, BTS announced a full-scale world tour extension, titled 2015 BTS Live Trilogy Episode II: The Red Bullet, starting June 6 at the Mega Star Arena in Malaysia followed by July dates in Australia and the United States.

Reception 
Shows in Dallas, Chicago, Los Angeles, and New York City were all sold out in the matter of minutes. BTS performed for over 12,500 fans for the US leg alone. The two concerts in Melbourne and Sydney were also sold out, despite the fact that the cities were located in a place that traditionally did not experience that level of success when it comes to selling out venues for K-pop acts. In Brazil, similar success happened. The original venue would have a maximum capacity of 2,000 people, however due to high demand the promoters transferred the concert to a venue with more than twice the capacity.

According to Billboard, BTS made their concert memorable with their outstanding performances.

Set list 
The following set list is obtained from the show on July 10, 2015 in Sydney, Australia. It is not intended to represent all dates throughout the tour extension.

 N.O
 We Are Bulletproof Pt 2.
 We On
 Hiphop Lover
 Let Me Know
 Rain
 Embarrassed
 Just One Day
 Look Here
 Outro: Propose (Jin, Jimin, V, Jungkook)
 No More Dream
 Tomorrow
 Miss Right
 I Like It
 If I Ruled The World
 Jump
 Cypher Pt.3 Killer (Rap Monster, SUGA, J-Hope)
 Cypher Pt.2 Triptych (encore) 
 War of Hormone
 Danger
 I NEED U
 Boy In Luv
Encore
  Path/Road
 DOPE
 Boyz With Fun
 Attack On Bangtan

Tour dates

Notes

References

2015 concert tours
BTS concert tours
Concert tours of Asia
Concert tours of Oceania
Concert tours of North America
Concert tours of South America
Concert tours of South Korea
Concert tours of Japan
Concert tours of the Philippines
Concert tours of Singapore
Concert tours of Thailand
Concert tours of Taiwan
Concert tours of Malaysia
Concert tours of Australia
Concert tours of the United States
Concert tours of Mexico
Concert tours of Hong Kong